Aamdani Atthanni Kharcha Rupaiya (Expenses are greater than wages) sometimes abbreviated as AAKR is a 2001 Indian Hindi-language comedy film directed by K. Raghavendra Rao starring Govinda, Juhi Chawla, Tabu and Johnny Lever.  This was the remake of Tamil film Viralukketha Veekkam directed by V. Sekhar. The film was an below average grosser at box office.

Plot 
This is a family story. Jhumri and her husband, Bhishma, move into a new neighborhood. Their neighbors are three bickering couples: Vijay and Anjali who are newly married; Appu Khote and Vimla, who are married and have four children; and Ravi and Meena, who are married and have a daughter. Slowly the husbands are running out of money so they trick their wives and go out for a vacation. Meanwhile, their wives are struggling to pay their rents and decide to work even though their husbands told them not to. When the husbands come back, they kick their wives out of the house since they got jobs. The wives go to live with Jhumri and Bhishma.

The husbands are struggling to cook and take care of their children and go out to bring a dance-bar girl home to cook and look after the children!. One day, Meena and Ravi's daughter, Rani, is diagnosed with a heart problem and needs to be operated on quickly. Both husband and wife try to get two lakh rupees to save her life. The wives they earn the amount by working hard, while Ravi tries smuggling drugs to get the money. The three men are then caught by the police, arrested and also beaten by the police. Bhishma helps them by finding the real owner of the smuggling commotion and freeing the men. The husbands realize their mistake and apologize to their wives. The husbands and the wives decide to work together for a better living. The story has a happy ending with the families living happily together.

Cast
Govinda as Bhishma
Juhi Chawla as Jhumri
Chandrachur Singh as Ravi
Tabu as Meena
Johnny Lever as Appu Khote
Vinay Anand as Vijay
Isha Koppikar as Anjali
Ketki Dave as Vimla
Mink Brar as Sukeshini (dancer)
Shakti Kapoor as Dhokla Bhai
Asrani as Jhumri's boss
Ranjeet as Boss of Motor Company
Tiku Talsania as B.K. Kakkad (landlord)
Raju Srivastava as Baba Chin Chin Choo
Razzak Khan as taxi driver
Sayaji Shinde as Bijnora
Viju Khote
Jaya Prakash Reddy as Police Inspector
Mahesh Thakur

Soundtrack

References

External links 
 

2000s Hindi-language films
Hindi remakes of Tamil films
2001 films
2001 comedy-drama films
Films directed by K. Raghavendra Rao
Films scored by Himesh Reshammiya
Indian comedy-drama films